Lasaea is a genus of bivalves belonging to the family Lasaeidae.

The genus has cosmopolitan distribution.

Species

Species:

Lasaea adansoni 
Lasaea australis 
Lasaea bermudensis 
Lasaea cistula 
Lasaea colmani 
Lasaea consanguinea 
Lasaea eastera 
Lasaea hawaiensis 
Lasaea helenae 
Lasaea hinemoa 
Lasaea macrodon 
Lasaea maoria 
Lasaea miliaris 
Lasaea nipponica 
Lasaea parengaensis 
Lasaea petitiana 
Lasaea purpurata 
Lasaea rubra 
Lasaea souverbiana 
Lasaea subviridis 
Lasaea turtoni 
Lasaea undulata

References

Lasaeidae
Bivalve genera